Neda Jebraeili (Persian: ندا جبرائیلی‎, born October 7, 1990) is an Iranian actress. She is best known for her acting in Bending the Rules (2013), Fish & Cat (2013), Boarding Pass (2017), Drowning in Holy Water (2020) and World War III (2022). She received two Crystal Simorgh nominations for her performances in Bending the Rules and Drowning in Holy Water.

Filmography

Film

Television

Awards and nominations

References

External links 
 

1990 births
Living people
People from Tehran
Actresses from Tehran
Iranian film actresses